Gondi may refer to:
Gondi people, an ethnic group of central India
Gondi language, the language of the Gondi people
Gondi writing, scripts used to write the language
Gondi (dumpling), a traditional Iranian Jewish food
Gondi, Zanjan, a village in Zanjan Province, Iran
Gondi (film), a 2020 Bangladeshi romantic comedy
The de Gondi family, a French aristocratic family
 Jean François Paul de Gondi, cardinal de Retz

See also 
 Gonda (disambiguation)
 Gondia, a city in the state of Maharashtra in Central India
 Gandhi (disambiguation)
 Mahatma Gandhi (1869–1948), Indian reformer and civil rights leader

Language and nationality disambiguation pages